Dudleyite is a mineral, named after Dudleyville, Alabama.  It is a vermiculite, hydrous  mica, that came from  margarite, or phlogopite.

References

Further reading 
 Proceedings of the American Philosophical Society, Vol. XIII p. 404 (1873)

Minerals